Amy Bowtell (born 16 September 1993) is a former tennis player and former Irish number one. Her highest WTA singles ranking is No. 381. Bowtell won ten professional titles, five singles and five doubles titles on the ITF Women's Circuit. She has been a member of Ireland Fed Cup team since 2009.

Personal life
Bowtell grew up playing in Greystones Lawn Tennis Club in Co. Wicklow. Bowtell is currently coached by Garry Cahill.

Career highlights
To date, Amy has reached seven ITF finals in singles, her first being a $10k tournament held in Chiswick, England on 1 August 2010. In the final, Amy lost to Tara Moore 3–6, 4–6. On 19 February 2012, she won her first ITF title, winning a $10k tournament held in Tallinn, Estonia against Polina Vinogradova 7–6, 6–4. She won her second title in April 2014, winning another $10,000 tournament, this time in Sharm El Sheikh, Egypt.

ITF Circuit finals

Singles: 10 (5 titles, 5 runner–ups)

Doubles: 8 (5 titles, 3 runner–ups)

Fed Cup performance

Singles (11–8)

Doubles (7–2)

References

External links
 
 
 

1993 births
Living people
Sportspeople from County Wicklow
People from Greystones
Irish female tennis players
Tennis players from Dublin (city)